International Centre for Climate Change and Development  (ICCCAD) is an environmental research institute established in 2009 through a joint collaboration between IIED (UK), Bangladesh Centre for Advanced Studies, and Independent University, Bangladesh (IUB). The centre is based in the campus of IUB, Dhaka. The director of the centre is Saleemul Huq.

It now also hosts the Bangladesh Academy for Climate Services (BACS).

References

External links
Official website

Environmental organisations based in Bangladesh
Research institutes in Bangladesh
2009 establishments in Bangladesh